
Dominique Guellec is a French economist. He formerly held the post of chief economist at the European Patent Office (EPO) (2004–2005). He is senior economist at Organisation for Economic Co-operation and Development (OECD) where he is in charge of the department monitoring innovation policies.

Bibliography
 The Economics of the European Patent System: IP Policy for Innovation and Competition, Oxford University Press, 2007, with Bruno van Pottelsberghe,

See also 
 Alain Pompidou
 Bruno van Pottelsberghe

References

External links
 2004 biography on the WIPO web site
 2003 biography on the WIPO web site
 Further reading:
 2007 interview on the website of the Staff Union of the EPO, SUEPO

French economists
Year of birth missing (living people)
Living people